Odor or odour, aroma, smell, scent, are things detected by the olfactory system

Odor or odour, may refer to:

 Odor (surname) or Ódor or O'Dor
 Odor Pond, Herkimer County, New York State, USA; a pond

See also

 
 
 ODEUR
 Oder (disambiguation)
 OD (disambiguation)